Paussotropus cylindricum is a species of beetles in the family Carabidae, the only species in the genus Paussotropus.

References

Pseudomorphinae
Monotypic Carabidae genera